Christian Schwochow (born 23 September 1978) is a German film director. He has directed more than ten films since 2005, including TV movie  on the ARD channel, a tragicomedy about the fall of the Berlin Wall. Schwochow also directed episodes of season 3 and season 5 of the Netflix series The Crown.

Life 
Christian Schwochow was born on the Island of Rügen, off the northern coast of West Pomerania in the German Democratic Republic (East Germany: 1949–1990).   , his mother, is a journalist and award-winning screenwriter.   He grew up in Leipzig, East Berlin and (after 1990) Hanover.   Through his mother's connections, he gained experience of work on the radio drama productions of the East German Radio Service while he was still a child.

Selected filmography

References

External links 

1978 births
Living people
People from Bergen auf Rügen
Mass media people from Mecklenburg-Western Pomerania